Stéphane Guérard (born April 12, 1968) is a Canadian retired professional ice hockey player who played 34 games in the National Hockey League for the Quebec Nordiques. Guérard was born in Sainte-Élisabeth, Quebec.

External links

1968 births
Canadian ice hockey defencemen
Shawinigan Cataractes players
Halifax Citadels players
Quebec Nordiques draft picks
Quebec Nordiques players
Living people
People from Lanaudière
Ice hockey people from Quebec
French Quebecers